David Harrington may refer to:

 David Harrington (musician), violinist and founder of the Kronos Quartet
 David Harrington (Medal of Honor) (1856–1945), U.S. Navy sailor and Medal of Honor recipient
 David C. Harrington (born 1954), American politician from Maryland
 David Harrington (mayor) (1936–2009), New Zealand politician